Presidential elections were held in the Comoros on 6 March 1996, with a second round on 16 March. They were won by Mohamed Taki Abdoulkarim, who had come second in the 1990 elections (despite winning the most votes in the first round), and who had briefly served as acting President in October 1995 in the aftermath of another coup attempt led by Bob Denard.

Results

References

Comoros
Presidential elections in the Comoros
President
Election and referendum articles with incomplete results